{{DISPLAYTITLE:C19H29NO2}}
The molecular formula C19H29NO2 (molar mass: 303.44 g/mol, exact mass: 303.2198 u) may refer to:

 Bornaprolol
 Nexeridine

Molecular formulas